Besano is a town and comune located in the province of Varese, in the Lombardy region of northern Italy.

Paleontological site

The fossils of Besano
In 1993 the fossil  of a Triassic aquatic reptile  dating back to about 235 million years was found near the town. It was named Besanosaurus. Many other fossils have emerged from the fossiliferous  field of Besano-Monte San Giorgio, known and appreciated since the mid-nineteenth century.

References

Cities and towns in Lombardy